Moca purpurascens is a moth in the family Immidae. It was described by George Hampson in 1893. It is found in India.

The wingspan is about 22 mm. Adults are black, with a brilliant purple shot, the forewings with two large yellow triangular spots on the costa. The hindwings have a yellow streak below the cell, curving up to the costa beyond it.

References

Moths described in 1893
Immidae
Moths of Asia